Venezuela women's national softball team is the national team for Venezuela. The team competed at the 1998 ISF Women's World Championship in Fujinomiya City, Japan where they finished eighth. The team competed at the 2002 ISF Women's World Championship in Saskatoon, Saskatchewan where they finished tenth. The team competed at the 2006 ISF Women's World Championship in Beijing, China where they finished seventh. The team competed at the 2010 ISF Women's World Championship in Caracas, Venezuela where they finished fifth.

References

External links 
 International Softball Federation

Softball
Women's national softball teams
Softball in Venezuela